Vairagi is a Hindu Sect who follow Vaishnavism. Celibate Ascetics of Vaishnav Sampradaya are called Vairagi or Bairagi.

History

The Vairagi term was first adopted by vaishnavas of Ramanandi Sampradaya. Later, it became the identity of followers of all four Vaishnava sampradayas.

References

Social groups of India
Hindu denominations